Canoeing at the 2014 Asian Games was held in Hanam Misari Canoe/Kayak Center, Hanam, South Korea from September 27 to October 2, 2014. There were sprints and a slalom on flat water and not an artificial canoe slalom course.

Schedule

Medalists

Slalom

Men

Women

Sprint

Men

Women

Medal table

Participating nations
A total of 228 athletes from 20 nations competed in canoeing at the 2014 Asian Games:

References

External links
Canoeing Slalom Site of 2014 Asian Games
Canoeing Sprint Site of 2014 Asian Games

 
2014 Asian Games events
Asian Games
2014
2014 Asian Games